William Roy Smith (1876–1938) was an American academic historian.

Career
Smith studied first at the University of Texas (A.B. 1897, A.M. 1898), and went on to complete a Ph.D. at Columbia University in 1902, as a student of William Archibald Dunning. He joined the faculty at Bryn Mawr College in 1902, and became professor of history in 1914. He married Marion Parris on 11 June 1912 in Manhattan, New York. He died in Bryn Mawr Hospital in February 1938.

Smith's essay "Negro Suffrage in the South", published in Studies in Southern History and Politics (1914), argued that the disenfranchisement of Black voters had been necessary in the late 19th century, but looked forward to a time when "a steadily increasing number of negroes, who are qualified by intelligence and character, will be readmitted to the voting ranks". Smith's justifications for post-Reconstruction disenfranchisement led W. E. B. Du Bois to list him in Black Reconstruction (1935) among "authors [that] believe the Negro to be sub-human and congenitally unfitted for citizenship and the suffrage".

Publications
 "The Quarrel between Governor Smith and the Provisional Government of the Republic", Quarterly of the Texas State Historical Association 5/4 (1902), pp. 269–346
 South Carolina as a Royal Province, 1710-1776 (Macmillan, 1903)
 "Negro Suffrage in the South", in Studies in Southern History and Politics Inscribed to William Archibald Dunning (Columbia University Press, 1914), pp. 229–256

References

1876 births
1938 deaths
University of Texas alumni
Columbia University alumni
Bryn Mawr College faculty